Possession is the third studio album by American indie rock band Joywave. It was released on March 13, 2020, through their own Cultco Music label and Hollywood Records. The album was supported by five singles prior to release; "Blastoffff", "Like a Kennedy", "Obsession", "Blank Slate", and "Half Your Age".

Recording and composition
Joywave recorded Possession at their studio in Rochester, New York. It was produced by band frontman Daniel Armbruster and mixed by Dan Grech-Marguerat. The recording of the album saw the band return to incorporating samples of audio into their songs. They had previously used audio samples of various Disney films for their debut album, How Do You Feel Now? (2015), but opted not to use samples at all for their following album, Content (2017). For Possession, the band used samples of audio from the Voyager Golden Record, a 1977 compilation of sounds (such as recordings taken of the tesla coils at the Rochester Museum and Science Center), spoken word pieces, and music curated by Carl Sagan, included on both Voyager space probes in order to create an image of life on Earth for any other lifeforms that might discover the spacecraft one day. The cover art for the Golden Record was also cited as the influence for the design of the Possession cover art.

Regarding the premise of the album, Armbruster stated that it focuses on the concept of control, examining it on a more broad societal level as well as a personal level. He added that "our heads are spinning. Every day is crazier than the last. Every screen we walk by is shouting at us, demanding our undivided attention. Control over our own lives is constantly under siege".

Promotion and release
Joywave released five singles over a span of 17 months leading up to the announcement of the album. The band chose to have a less conventional campaign for the album. They slowly released singles over a long period of time leading up to the album release, instead of the typical system of releasing the album first and then following it up with singles. Armbruster contrasted their album campaign to television shows on Netflix, which consumers are often able to view multiple episodes of in one sitting, therefore consuming the content all at once.

The first single released from Possession was "Blastoffff", released on July 12, 2018. On the same day, it was used in a trailer to promote the fifth season of battle royale video game Fortnite. The band did not release another single for 11 months, until the release of the song "Like a Kennedy" on June 21, 2019. The release was accompanied with a press release detailing their upcoming album as well as an announcement of dates for their "Possession Sessions" tour. The band released the song "Obsession" on August 9, which was accompanied with its own music video. The band eventually added extra dates to the tour, and also released the song "Blank Slate" on November 1.

On January 7, 2020, the band announced that their upcoming third album, Possession, would be released on March 13. The announcement was made in conjunction with the release of the song "Half Your Age". The album's track list as well as dates for a North American tour were also revealed.

Track listing

Personnel
Personnel adapted from album liner notes.

Joywave
Daniel Armbruster – vocals, electric guitar, acoustic guitar, bass guitar, piano, keyboards, flute, shaker
Benjamin Bailey – piano, electric guitar, acoustic guitar, keyboards, organ, theremin, recorder
Paul Brenner – drums
Joseph Morinelli – electric guitar, bass guitar, acoustic guitar

Additional musicians
Jesse Blum – trumpet 
Sameer Gadhia – backing vocals 

Technical personnel
Daniel Armbruster – producer, engineer
Dan Grech-Marguerat – mixing, programming
John Hill – co-producer 
Joe LaPorta – mastering
Blake Mares – engineer
Evyn Morgan – artwork, layout, photography

Reception

Critical

The album was well-received upon its release. Neil Z. Yeung at AllMusic summed it up as "hypnotic, often dance-friendly beats bubble up beneath inventive sampling choices and melodic synths, balancing the occasional upbeat jam with dark, ominous soundscapes".

Commercial
The album reached number 34 in the iTunes Alternative Albums chart, and number 17 in Greece.
The title track reached number 15 in Portugal.

See also
List of 2020 albums

References

2020 albums
Joywave albums
Hollywood Records albums